Lagoa da Confusão is the westernmost city in the state of Tocantins.

References 

Municipalities in Tocantins